Lee Lu-da (born March 6, 1997), better known by the mononym Luda, is a South Korean singer. She debuted as a member of South Korean-Chinese girl group WJSN under Starship and Yuehua Entertainment in 2016.

Career

2016–present: Debut with WJSN, WJMK and solo activities

Luda was revealed to be a member of WJSN and its 'Natural Unit' on December 31, 2015. WJSN debuted on February 25, 2016, with the release of their debut EP Would You Like?, including the lead singles "Mo Mo Mo" and "Catch Me".

On May 2, 2018, Starship Entertainment and Fantagio collaborated to form a special four-member unit named WJMK, consisting of members of their respective girl groups WJSN and Weki Meki. The group consists of four members: Yoojung, Doyeon, Seola and Luda. They released the single "Strong" on June 1, 2018, along with the music video.

In 2018, she was cast as a member of the MBC variety show Dunia: Into a New World. Luda released her first solo single, titled "Dreamland", as part of the official soundtrack for Dunia: Into a New World.

On September 23, 2020, announced the formation of the new sub-unit WJSN Chocome, featuring members Luda, Dayoung, Soobin, and Yeoreum. They released their debut single album Hmph!, and its title track with the same name on October 7, 2020.

On September 19, 2022, Starship Entertainment announced that Luda will make her acting debut in the web drama My X Twenty, set to premier in December.

On March 3, 2023, Starship Entertainment announced Luda chosen not to renew her contract with the label however it wasn't explicitly stated if she had left the group.

Discography

Filmography

Television series

Web series

Television shows

Web shows

Awards and nominations

References

External links

WJSN, Luda at Starship Entertainment 
WJSN, Luda at Yuehua Entertainment 

1997 births
Living people
Singers from Seoul
Mandarin-language singers of South Korea
Starship Entertainment artists
South Korean female idols
South Korean women pop singers
Cosmic Girls members
21st-century South Korean women singers
21st-century South Korean singers